Morgan Larson may refer to:

Morgan Larson (sailor), an American sailor who has competed in the America's Cup and Extreme Sailing Series.
Morgan Foster Larson, a Republican politician who served as the 40th Governor of New Jersey.

Larson, Morgan